Four Tops is the 1965 self-titled debut studio album by the American vocal group the Four Tops. The album was written and produced by the Motown's main writing/producing team Holland-Dozier-Holland. Four Tops includes the singles "Baby I Need Your Loving" , "Without the One You Love (Life's Not Worth While)", and "Ask the Lonely".

Track listing
Side 1
 "Baby I Need Your Loving" (Holland–Dozier–Holland) - 2:43
 "Without the One You Love (Life's Not Worth While)" (Holland–Dozier–Holland) - 2:43
 "Where Did You Go?" (Holland–Dozier–Holland) - 2:25
 "Ask the Lonely" (William "Mickey" Stevenson) - 2:44
 "Your Love Is Amazing" (Holland–Dozier–Holland) - 2:22
 "Sad Souvenirs" (Ivy Jo Hunter, William "Mickey" Stevenson) - 2:39
Side 2
"Don't Turn Away" (Ivy Jo Hunter, Stevenson) - 2:37
 "Tea House in China Town" (Hunter, Stevenson) - 2:47
 "Left With a Broken Heart" (Marv Johnson) - 2:56
 "Love Has Gone" (Holland–Dozier–Holland) - 2:50
 "Call on Me" (Holland–Dozier–Holland) - 2:33

Personnel

 Levi Stubbs – lead vocals
 Abdul Fakir – vocals
 Renaldo Benson – vocals 
 Lawrence Payton – vocals, keyboard
 The Andantes – background vocals
 Instrumentation by the Funk Brothers

See also
 List of number-one R&B albums of 1965 (U.S.)

References

External links
 Four Tops – Four Tops (1964) album releases & credits on Discogs.com
 Four Tops – Four Tops (1964) album to be listened as stream on Spotify.com

Four Tops albums
1965 debut albums
Albums produced by Brian Holland
Albums produced by Lamont Dozier
Albums recorded at Hitsville U.S.A.
Motown albums